Watch Your Step is a musical with music and lyrics by Irving Berlin and a book by Harry B. Smith.  It was Irving Berlin's debut musical.  "Play a Simple Melody" and "They Always Follow Me Around" as well as "When I Discovered You" and "The Syncopated Walk" were introduced by this musical.  A highlight of the show was the Act II Finale, "Opera in Modern Time" in which melodies from famous operas were turned into popular dances of the time.  The Ghost of Verdi then appeared to protest the ragging of his "Rigoletto" to no avail.
"Watch Your Step" marked the first time a Tin Pan Alley composer moved "uptown" to Broadway with a complete score.

Productions
The original Broadway production, produced by Charles Dillingham, opened at the New Amsterdam Theatre on December 8, 1914.  It ran for 175 performances and featured in the cast Vernon and Irene Castle, Frank Tinney, Elizabeth Murray, Harry Kelly and Justine Johnstone.

References

Musicals by Irving Berlin
1914 musicals
Broadway musicals